A prospect is an organization or potential client who resembles a seller's ideal customer profile (ICP), but has not yet expressed interest in their products or services; accordingly a qualified lead is an organization or potential client which has expressed interest in the products or services of the seller.

There is much debate in the sales profession as to what constitutes an actual "qualified" prospect. Most sales professionals apply their own unique set of criteria in order to determine whether a prospect is actually "qualified."

In general terms, sales professionals need to know a set of discrete data in order to determine whether or not the "prospect" will become qualified. These variables may include: business needs, authorization to transact business (financial or operational), money or budget and an "economic buyer" or in other words, who would benefit the most (or lose the most) if the good or service were to be acquired (or not acquired).

The oldest and most widely used qualification criteria  is BANT (Budget, Authority, Need, Timing). Developed by IBM in the 1950s, this method has stuck because it is easy to remember and provided an easy way to teach new salespeople how to sell.

Another subject in the buying process is usually referred to as either an "influencer" or a "saboteur", someone who, although not the financial or operational authority, exercises a significant level of internal control or leverage in the buying process.

Salespeople encounter a multitude of objections in their attempts to connect with and qualify prospects. These objections are a chance to explain the value of the product or service to try to qualify the prospect and close the sale. 

Sales prospecting is the process to reach out to a potential customer. It is the first part of a sales process. After this step, the lead qualification, follow-up and sales activity start.

See also
 Sales process
 Buying center
 Industrial marketing

References

Sales
Marketing